Chita is a town in Trinity County, Texas.  It was settled around the Civil War era.  In 1895, a post office was established, and in 1896, a school was founded. In 2000, the population was 81.

References

Unincorporated communities in Trinity County, Texas
Unincorporated communities in Texas